Rainbow Valley is a small valley in Riverside County and San Diego County in the U.S. state of California. It is the site of the settlement named Rainbow.

The area was previously known as Vallecitos ("little valley") and was renamed Rainbow Valley in the late 1880s after James Peebles Marshall Rainbow, who bought a homestead there.

References

Valleys of San Diego County, California
Valleys of Riverside County, California